The Standard of Ur is a Sumerian artifact of the 3rd millennium BC that is now in the collection of the British Museum. It comes from the ancient city of Ur (located in modern-day Iraq west of Nasiriyah). It dates to the First Dynasty of Ur during the Early Dynastic period and is around 4,600 years old. The standard was probably constructed in the form of a hollow wooden box with scenes of war and peace represented on each side through elaborately inlaid mosaics. Although interpreted as a standard by its discoverer, its original purpose remains enigmatic. It was found in a royal tomb in Ur in the 1920s next to the skeleton of a ritually sacrificed man who may have been its bearer.

History

The artifact was found in one of the largest royal tombs in the Royal Cemetery at Ur, tomb PG 779, associated with Ur-Pabilsag, a king who died around 2550 BC. Sir Leonard Woolley's excavations in Mesopotamia in 1927–28 uncovered the artifact in the corner of a chamber, lying close to the shoulder of a man who may have held it on a pole. For this reason, Woolley interpreted it as a standard, giving the object its popular name, although subsequent investigation has failed to confirm this assumption. The discovery was quite unexpected, as the tomb in which it occurred had been thoroughly plundered by robbers in ancient times. As one corner of the last chamber was being cleared, a workman spotted a piece of shell inlay. Woolley later recalled that "the next minute the foreman's hand, carefully brushing away the earth, laid bare the corner of a mosaic in lapis lazuli and shell."

The Standard of Ur survived in only a fragmentary condition. The ravages of time over more than four thousand years caused the decay of the wooden frame and bitumen glue which had cemented the mosaics in place. The soil's weight crushed the object, fragmenting it and breaking its end panels. This made excavating the Standard a challenging task. Woolley's excavators were instructed to look for hollows in the ground created by decayed objects and to fill them with plaster or wax to record the shape of the objects that had once filled them, rather like the famous plaster casts of the victims of Pompeii. When the remains of the Standard were discovered by the excavators, they found that the mosaic pieces had kept their form in the soil, while their wooden frame had disintegrated.

Description

The present form of the artifact is a reconstruction, presenting a best guess of its original appearance. The box has an irregular shape with end pieces in the shape of truncated triangles, making it wider at the bottom than at the top.

Inlaid mosaic panels cover each long side of the Standard. Each presents a series of scenes displayed in three registers, upper, middle and bottom. The two mosaics have been dubbed "War" and "Peace" for their subject matter, respectively a representation of a military campaign and scenes from a banquet. The panels at each end originally showed fantastical animals but they suffered significant damage while buried, though they have since been restored. Both sides use hierarchical proportion in the depiction of the forms of the art, with the most important individuals appearing larger than less important ones.

Mosaic scenes

"War" is one of the earliest representations of a Sumerian army, engaged in what is believed to be a border skirmish and its aftermath. The "War" panel shows the king in the middle of the top register, standing taller than any other figure, with his head projecting out of the frame to emphasize his supreme status – a device also used on the other panel. He stands in front of his bodyguard and a four-wheeled wagon, drawn by a team of some sort of equids (possibly onagers or domestic asses; horses were only introduced in the 2nd millennium BC after being imported from Central Asia). He faces a row of prisoners, all of whom are portrayed as naked, bound and injured with large, bleeding gashes on their chests and thighs – a device indicating defeat and debasement. In the middle register, eight virtually identically depicted soldiers give way to a battle scene, followed by a depiction of enemies being captured and led away. The soldiers are shown wearing leather cloaks and helmets; actual examples of the sort of helmet depicted in the mosaic were found in the same tomb. The nudity of the captive and dead enemies was probably not meant to depict literally how they appeared in real life, but was more likely to have been symbolic and associated with a Mesopotamian belief that linked death with nakedness.

The lower register shows four wagons, each carrying a driver and a warrior (carrying either a spear or an axe) and drawn by a team of four equids. The wagons are depicted in considerable detail; each has solid wheels (spoked wheels were not invented until about 1800 BC) and carries spare spears in a container at the front. The arrangement of the equids' reins is also shown in detail, illustrating how the Sumerians harnessed them without using bits, which were only introduced a millennium later. The wagon scene evolves from left to right in a way that emphasizes motion and action through changes in the depiction of the animals' gait. The first wagon team is shown walking, the second cantering, the third galloping and the fourth rearing. Trampled enemies are shown lying under the hooves of the latter three groups, symbolizing the potency of a wagon attack.

"Peace" portrays a banquet scene. The king again appears in the upper register, sitting on a carved stool on the left-hand side. He is faced by six other seated participants, each holding a cup raised in his right hand. They are attended by various other figures including a long-haired individual, possibly a singer, who accompanies a lyrist. In the middle register, bald-headed figures wearing skirts with fringes parade animals, fish and other goods, perhaps bringing them to the feast. The bottom register shows a series of figures dressed and coiffed in a different way from those above, carrying produce in shoulder bags or backpacks, or leading equids by ropes attached to nose rings.

Interpretations

The original function of the Standard of Ur is not conclusively understood. Woolley's suggestion that it represented a standard is now thought unlikely. It has also been speculated that it was the soundbox of a musical instrument. Paola Villani suggests that it was used as a chest to store funds for warfare or civil and religious works. It is, however, impossible to say for sure, as there is no inscription on the artifact to provide any background context.

Although the side mosaics are usually referred to as the "war side" and "peace side", they may in fact be a single narrative – a battle followed by a victory celebration. This would be a visual parallel with the literary device of merism, used by the Sumerians, in which the totality of a situation was described through the pairing of opposite concepts. A Sumerian ruler was considered to have a dual role as a lugal (literally "big man" or war leader) and an en or civic/religious leader, responsible for mediating with the gods and maintaining the fecundity of the land. The Standard of Ur may have been intended to depict these two complementary concepts of Sumerian kingship.

The scenes depicted in the mosaics were reflected in the tombs where the "Standard" was found. The skeletons of attendants and musicians were found accompanying the remains of the kings, as was equipment used in both the "War" and "Peace" scenes of the mosaics. Unlike ancient Egyptian tombs, the dead were not buried with provisions of food and serving equipment; instead, they were found with the remains of meals, such as empty food vessels and animal bones. They may have participated in one last ritual feast, the remains of which were buried alongside them, before being put to death (possibly by poisoning) to accompany their master in the afterlife.

See also

Lyres of Ur
Royal Cemetery at Ur

Notes

References

Sources

External links

 Podcast of The Standard of Ur BBC Radio programme (mp3)

 What is the Standard of Ur?

26th-century BC works
1920s archaeological discoveries
Sumerian art and architecture
Middle Eastern objects in the British Museum
Archaeological discoveries in Iraq
First Dynasty of Ur
Musical instruments in art
Individual hardstone carvings
Iraq–United Kingdom relations